The Chlorociboriaceae are a family of "cup fungi" in the order Helotiales, with type genus  Chlorociboria.  A second genus Brahmaculus, which occurs only in the southern hemisphere (including Chile, New Zealand and Australia), was added in 2021.

References

Helotiales
Ascomycota families
Taxa described in 2015